The Macau General Post Office is a 3-storey building at the intersection of Senado Square and Avenida de Almeida Ribeiro in Sé, Macau, China. The current building was built in 1929.

See also
 CTT (Macau)

References

1929 establishments in Macau
Landmarks in Macau
Government buildings in Macau
Sé, Macau
Buildings and structures in Macau
Post office buildings